The Rand Club is a private members' club in Johannesburg, South Africa, founded in October 1887. The current (third) clubhouse was designed by architects Leck & Emley in 1902 and its construction completed in 1904. Cecil John Rhodes helped to select the location.

History 

The club was founded only a year after the city of Johannesburg itself was formed. The need for such an establishment was felt as, in the burgeoning gold rush tent town of the time, there was little infrastructure and no suitable locale for distinguished visitors or pioneers to call in or be received at. It is said that Cecil John Rhodes was walking along the newly laid-out Marshall's Township together with Dr Hans Sauer, the first District Surgeon of the Transvaal Republic; both of them stopped at the intersection of what is now Commissioner and Loveday streets, with Rhodes proclaiming that “this place will do for a club.”

The first subscribers, who became the founding members, received two plots as a voluntary contribution and purchased two additional ones in order to ensure that the future building provided spacious facilities. The construction of the first clubhouse promptly began with the erection of a simple single-story structure, housing a bar, a billiards room, four conference rooms, and offices for the chairman and the secretary. This quickly proved inadequate and this structure was demolished to make way for a double-story Victorian building, then deemed the finest in Johannesburg, with colonnaded verandas, trelliswork, French windows, and Corinthian pillars. By 1902, this too proved inadequate and was replaced with the current, third, clubhouse.

The club and its members have played important parts and have held notable positions in South African history. Mining magnates such as Sir Jilius Jeppe, Sir Hermann Eckstein and Sir Lionel Phillips were instrumental in turning the Witwatersrand into the largest goldfield in the world, as well as for sponsoring the construction of the Johannesburg Art Gallery and donating important pieces of art to it. Rhodes's associate, Dr Leander Starr Jameson, together with his fellow plotters from the Transvaal Reform Committee plotted the overthrow of the government of the Transvaal from the club's Main Bar. The club was one of the targets of the striking miners during the Rand Rebellion of 1922 and was briefly barricaded during the disturbances.

Clubhouse

Architecture and interiors 

The current clubhouse was completed in 1904 on the design of prominent architects William Leck and Frank Emley in the Edwardian neo-baroque style. It is said that Emley drew inspiration from Michelangelo’s Church of the Sacred Heart in Florence and from the Reform Club in London. The front façade of the building has a rusticated ground floor and is adorned with porticoes and Doric pillars. A notable feature is the specific incorporation of two half-moon wooden benches flanking the front doors, as by 1904 it was already an established tradition for some members to sit at the front and observe passing street life.

The top two floors are still under restoration following a fire in June 2005 that destroyed the top two floors of the building.

Art collection 

The club's most prominent artwork, a Pietro Annigoni of Queen Elizabeth II, was destroyed by the fire in June 2005. The club interiors are adorned by sculptures and paintings from some of the most prominent South African artists, past and current.

Library 

The main Buckland Library houses in excess of 10,000 volumes, some of which are of historic and scholarly interest. The club is acknowledged as one of the notable private collections of Africa, with some volumes dating back to the 19th century. Apart from books on Africa, the club is a veritable depository in the fields of Johannesburg history and biographies. With a number of its members being published authors in their own right, the library has a separate section of works by Sir Lionel Phillips and Anthony Akerman, amongst others.

Royal residence 

The club is unique in that it was used not once, but twice, as an official residence by members of the British royal family on their official visits to South Africa in the 1920s and 1930s.

Governance

General meetings and committee 

The governance of the club vests with the members in general meeting. An annual general meeting is traditionally held on 20 November, with additional meetings as the need arises.  Members traditionally elect a General Committee to perform the oversight over daily functions and management.

Internal clubs 

Rand Club has various clubs within itself, of which the most notable are the Hunting, Shooting & Fishing Club, the Business Club, the Historical Association, the Theatre & Cinema Club, and the Young Members’ Think Tank. Each of these clubs-within-the club hosts its own regular events, dinners, and celebrations.

See also 
 Durban Club
 Owl Club

References

External links
 

Buildings and structures in Johannesburg
Gentlemen's clubs in South Africa
Heritage Buildings in Johannesburg